Moin Aqeeb Ashraf (born 5 January 1992) is an English first-class cricketer, who played for Yorkshire County Cricket Club. His best season was in 2012 when he led Yorkshire's T20 attack with Mitchell Starc, helping Yorkshire reach the T20 finals day at Cardiff before losing to Hampshire in the final.

He was released by Yorkshire, after five years at the club, in September 2015.
During the 2016 season he signed for Northants on a short-term basis, to cover for injuries within the squad.

References

1992 births
English cricketers
Living people
Yorkshire cricketers
Cricketers from Bradford
Leeds/Bradford MCCU cricketers
Northamptonshire cricketers
English cricketers of the 21st century
British Asian cricketers